SDIA may refer to:

Saemangeum Development and Investment Agency
 Susila Dharma International Association
 San Diego International Airport
 Soap and Detergent Industry Association, a former name of the UK Cleaning Products Industry Association
 Shajapur Dewas Industrial Area